Timothy R. Goodwin (born May 6, 1955) is an American politician and businessman serving as a member of the South Dakota House of Representatives from the 30th district. A Republican, Goodwin assumed office on January 10, 2017.

Background 
Goodwin was born in Minneapolis, Minnesota. At the age of 18, enlisted in the United States Army as a member of the 82nd Airborne Division. After serving in the Army for 24 years, Goodwin retired with the rank of Lieutenant colonel. Prior to serving in the South Dakota House, Goodwin worked as a salesman. Since 2019, Goodwin has served as one of four Majority Whips in the South Dakota House of Representatives.

Goodwin and his wife, Marcia, have eight children.

Election history

References 

Living people
Republican Party members of the South Dakota House of Representatives
1955 births
People from Minneapolis
21st-century American politicians